The Cairns Marlins are an Australian basketball team based in Cairns, Queensland. The Marlins compete in the men's NBL1 North league and play their home games at Early Settler Stadium. The team is closely affiliated with the Cairns Taipans and Cairns Basketball, the major administrative basketball organisation in the region.

Team history

Entry into the QBL
After operating a successful basketball program in Cairns, Queensland, Cairns Basketball joined the Queensland State Basketball League in its second season in 1987. They fielded two teams, the Cairns Marlins in the men's competition and the Cairns Dolphins in the women's competition.

Expansion to the NBL 
Between 1993 and 1998 the Marlins won four championships, prompting calls for Cairns to join the Australian National Basketball League. The Cairns Taipans joined the NBL for the 1999–2000 season, with Marlin's head coach Rod Popp coaching the team.

Since the Taipans' entry into the NBL the two teams have remained very close, often sharing development and training players over the NBL off-season and the QBL season.

Championship dynasty 
The Marlins are the most successful team in the QBL, holding nine championships since the team joined the league. They also make regular appearances in the playoffs, making 19 appearances over 26 seasons since 1993.

Transfer to NBL1 
After a successful first season in 2019, in 2020 the NBL1 expanded into Queensland and replaced the QBL. After this change, the Marlins transferred to the NBL1 North.

Season by season

Current squad

References

External links
Cairns Basketball's official website

 
Queensland Basketball League teams
Basketball teams established in 1987
Basketball teams in Queensland
1987 establishments in Australia
Sport in Cairns